The American Journal of International Law is an English-language scholarly journal focusing on international law and international relations. It is published quarterly since 1907 by the American Society of International Law (ASIL).

The Journal contains summaries and analyses of decisions by national and international courts and arbitral or other tribunals, and of contemporary U.S. practice in international law. Each issue lists recent publications in English and other languages, many of which are reviewed in depth. Earlier issues of the journal contain full-text primary materials of importance in the field of international law.

The Society's history and contributions to international law are chronicled in Frederic L. Kirgis, The American Society of International Law's First Century: 1906-2006 " (Brill, 2006).

According to the Journal Citation Reports, the journal has a 2014 impact factor of 1.667, ranking it 14th out of 85 journals in the category "International Relations".

See also 
 List of international relations journals

References

American law journals
International law journals
Publications established in 1907
Cambridge University Press academic journals